William F. Meredith (died May 14, 1959) was an American football and basketball coach. He served as the head football coach (1923–1925) and head men's basketball coach (1923–1926) at Ashland University in Ashland, Ohio. Meredith was the head football coach at Ohio Northern University in Ada, Ohio from 1926 to 1928.

References

Year of birth missing
1959 deaths
Ashland Eagles football coaches
Ashland Eagles men's basketball coaches
Ohio Northern Polar Bears football coaches
Denison University alumni
Sportspeople from Ohio